Fast Life is a 1929 American drama film directed by John Francis Dillon and written by John F. Goodrich. It is based on the 1928 play Fast Life by Samuel Shipman and John B. Hymer. The film stars Douglas Fairbanks Jr., Loretta Young, William Holden, Frank Sheridan, Chester Morris and Ray Hallor. The film was released by Warner Bros. on September 1, 1929.

Plot
A man is tried and convicted for the murder of a man who flirted with his wife and sentenced to death However, it turns out that he is innocent of the murder and that the real killer has close ties to a powerful politician.

Cast
Douglas Fairbanks Jr. as Douglas Stratton
Loretta Young as Patricia Mason Stratton
William Holden as Governor
Frank Sheridan as Warden
Chester Morris as Paul Palmer
Ray Hallor as Rodney Hall
John St. Polis as Andrew Stratton
Purnell Pratt as Berton Hall

References

External links
 

1929 films
1920s English-language films
1929 drama films
First National Pictures films
Warner Bros. films
Films directed by John Francis Dillon
1920s American films